Kévin Hecquefeuille (born 20 November 1984) is a French ice hockey coach for Scorpions de Mulhouse in the French Ligue Magnus. He previously played as a defenseman, in a career that lasted from 2002 to 2022. Internationally Hecquefeuille played for the French national team in multiple World Championships.

Career
Hecquefeuille played the majority of his early career in the French Ligue Magnus for Les Gothiques d'Amiens and Les Brûleurs de Loups. In 2003, Kévin won the Jean-Pierre Graff Trophy as the best rookie in the Ligue Magnus.

Beginning in 2008, he took his game abroad, playing in countries like Sweden (Nybro Vikings IF, Karlskrona HK), Germany (Kölner Haie), and Switzerland (Genève-Servette HC, SCL Tigers) in the following years. He worked out with the Vienna Capitals in November 2016, but left the Austrian club after four days due to personal reasons.

On December 18, 2016, he was offered a PTO by EHC Kloten of the National League A (NLA) and was then signed to a short-term contract as a replacement for injured Bobby Sanguinetti. He left Kloten when his contract expired in January 2017.

On January 24, 2017, he joined HC La Chaux-de-Fonds for the remainder of the 2016–17 season.

He also played 19 years for the French national team.

He retired from playing in 2022, and on 28 March 2022 became the coach of Scorpions de Mulhouse.

Career statistics

Regular season and playoffs

International

References

External links

1984 births
Living people
Brûleurs de Loups players
French ice hockey defencemen
Genève-Servette HC players
Gothiques d'Amiens players
HC La Chaux-de-Fonds players
Karlskrona HK players
EHC Kloten players
Kölner Haie players
Lausanne HC players
Nybro Vikings players
SCL Tigers players
Scorpions de Mulhouse players
Sportspeople from Amiens